Jade Louise Jones  (born 21 March 1993) is a Welsh taekwondo athlete. She is the 2012 and 2016 Olympic gold medallist in the women's 57 kg category, and the 2019 World champion, 2016, 2018 and 2021 European champion and 2015 European Games champion at the same weight. In 2012, she won Britain's first taekwondo Olympic gold medal in this category. Jones was at the time the reigning Youth Olympic champion in the girls' 55 kg category, winning gold for Great Britain in 2010.

Career history
Jones was born in Bodelwyddan, Denbighshire, Wales. She attended Flint High School leaving aged 16 to take up taekwondo full-time. She competes as part of the GB Taekwondo Academy, which is based in Manchester.

In 2010 Jones won a bronze medal at the 2010 European Taekwondo Championships in Saint Petersburg, Russia. Jones competed for Great Britain at the inaugural Summer Youth Olympics in Singapore; she beat Vietnam's Thanh Thao Nguyen 9–6 in the 55 kg category final to become Great Britain's first gold medallist at the Games. She was named BBC Cymru Wales Junior Sportswoman of the Year 2010. She is nicknamed "The Headhunter" because she prefers to try to score points from her opponent's head rather than their body as successful kicks to the head are awarded more points than successful kicks to the body.

Jones won her first senior title at the US Open in Austin, Texas in February 2011. She won gold in the −62 kg division having won bronze in the −57 kg competition the previous day. At the 2011 World Taekwondo Championships in Gyeongju, South Korea Jones advanced to the final of the 57 kg event after beating Marlène Harnois of France in the semi-finals. She won the silver medal after losing to China's Hou Yuzhuo in a sudden-death round. In October 2011 Jones won a gold medal at the British Open in Manchester by defeating Harnois 10–8 in the final. At the French Open she won a bronze medal after losing to Harnois in the semi-finals.

At the German Open held in Hamburg in March 2012 Jones won a silver medal losing to China's Yun Wang in the final. In May 2012 she won a bronze medal at the 2012 European Taekwondo Championships in Manchester.

Jones was selected to compete for Great Britain at the 2012 Summer Olympics in the women's 57 kg weight category. In the games Jones beat Chinese Taipei's top seed Tseng Li-Cheng in the semi-finals after having beaten Japan's Mayu Hamada in the quarter-finals and Serbia's Dragana Gladović in her first bout. In the final on 9 August 2012. she beat Hou Yuzhuo of China 6 points to 4 to become the first Briton to win a taekwondo gold medal.

Jones narrowly lost 10–9 to Iranian Kimia Alizadeh at the quarter-finals stage of the 2015 World Taekwondo Championships in Russia on 17 May 2015. The result was controversial, as the electronic scoring system crashed during the bout.
At the 2016 Olympic Games, Jones again won the gold medal, beating Spain's Eva Calvo, by 16–7 in the final.

Jones won the public vote for the BBC Wales Sports Personality of the Year 2012. Jones was appointed Member of the Order of the British Empire (MBE) in the 2013 New Year Honours for services to taekwondo and Officer of the Order of the British Empire (OBE) in the 2020 New Year Honours for services to taekwondo and sport.

She won one of the bronze medals in the women's featherweight event at the 2022 World Taekwondo Championships held in Guadalajara, Mexico.

Personal life

Jade was introduced to taekwondo by her grandfather when he saw her misbehaving at age eight. She lives with a roommate, Bianca Walkden, a fellow Olympic Taekwondo Fighter. The two are training partners, along with Walkden's partner, another Olympic Taekwondo Fighter, Aaron Cook.

See also
 2012 Olympics gold post boxes in the United Kingdom
 List of Youth Olympic Games gold medalists who won Olympic gold medals

References

External links

 
Jade Jones on Instagram

1993 births
Living people
European Games gold medalists for Great Britain
European Games medalists in taekwondo
European Taekwondo Championships medalists
Medalists at the 2012 Summer Olympics
Medalists at the 2016 Summer Olympics
Officers of the Order of the British Empire
Olympic gold medallists for Great Britain
Olympic medalists in taekwondo
Olympic taekwondo practitioners of Great Britain
People from Flint, Flintshire
Sportspeople from Flintshire
Taekwondo practitioners at the 2010 Summer Youth Olympics
Taekwondo practitioners at the 2012 Summer Olympics
Taekwondo practitioners at the 2015 European Games
Taekwondo practitioners at the 2016 Summer Olympics
Taekwondo practitioners at the 2020 Summer Olympics
Welsh female taekwondo practitioners
Welsh Olympic medallists
World Taekwondo Championships medalists
Youth Olympic gold medalists for Great Britain
21st-century British women